Ratchaprarop Station is an Airport Rail Link station on the Ratchaprarop Road. The station is integrated with the SRT Eastern Line trains at Phaya Thai Halt. In the future, it can be transferred to MRT Orange Line at Ratchaprarop MRT Station.

Station layout

Operational time

Bus connection 
 Ratchaprarop/Din Daeng Triangle line 13 14 17 54 62 74 77 204 513 539
 Ratchaprarop/Pratunam line 13 14 17 54 62 72 74 77 183 204 513
 Si Ayutthaya line 14 17 62 72 74 77 183 204 513 539

External links
 Airport Rail Link

Airport Rail Link (Bangkok) stations